William Hugh Beeton, CMG (14 October 1903 – 26 March 1976) was the Chief Commissioner of Ashanti, which became Ghana in 1957. Beeton also served as Vice President of The Royal African Society.

Education
William Hugh Beeton was educated at Strathallan School in Perthshire and the London School of Economics, University of London.

Career
  Assistant District Commissioner, Gold Coast, 1926.
  District Commissioner, Gold Coast, 1932.
  Administrative Officer, Class II, 1943.
  Senior Assistant Colonial Secretary, 1944.
  Administrative Officer, Class I, 1946. (Assistant Chief Commissioner, Ashanti)
  Chief Commissioner, Ashanti, 1950-54. (Title changed to Chief Regional Officer 1952)

Awards
Appointed a Companion of St Michael and St George, 1954.

References

External links
  National Archives - Oxford University: Bodlein Library of Commonwealth and African Studies at Rhodes House - Beeton, William Hugh (1903-1976) Colonial Administrator

1903 births
1976 deaths
People educated at Strathallan School
Alumni of the London School of Economics
Companions of the Order of St Michael and St George